107th Street–Beverly Hills is one of five Metra stations within the Beverly Hills neighborhood of Chicago, Illinois, along the Beverly Branch of the Rock Island District Line. The station is located at 1901 West 107th Street opposite the intersection of South Walden Parkway,  from LaSalle Street Station, the northern terminus of the line. In Metra's zone-based fare system, 107th Street is in zone C. As of 2018, 107th Street–Beverly Hills is the 121st busiest of Metra's 236 non-downtown stations, with an average of 395 weekday boardings.

As of 2022, 107th Street–Beverly Hills is served by 20 trains in each direction on weekdays, by 10 inbound trains and 11 outbound trains on Saturdays, and by eight trains in each direction on Sundays.

107th Street Station contains its original station house, but is unstaffed. Parking is available along both side of the tracks between 105th Street and 108th Street. South Walden Parkway runs along the west side of the tracks and contains parking lots between the street and the tracks. Although this street terminates at 107th Street, the parking lot continues to 108th Street. On the east side of the tracks, a parking lot runs north from 108th Street behind the west side of Hale Avenue. Between 107th and 105th Streets, another parking lot runs directly between Hale Avenue and the tracks. No bus connections are available.

References

External links

Station from 107th Street from Google Maps Street View

Metra stations in Chicago
Former Chicago, Rock Island and Pacific Railroad stations
Railway stations in the United States opened in 1892